The Bishop of Richborough is a suffragan bishop and provincial episcopal visitor for the whole of the Province of Canterbury in the Church of England.

History
The see was erected under the Suffragans Nomination Act 1888 by Order in Council dated 8 February 1994 and licensed by the Archbishop of Canterbury as a "flying bishop" to provide episcopal oversight for parishes throughout the province which cannot in good conscience accept the sacramental ministry of bishops who have participated in the ordination of women. The title takes its name from Richborough, a settlement north of Sandwich in Kent. In the southern province, the bishops of Ebbsfleet and of Richborough each minister in 13 of the 40 dioceses. The Bishop of Richborough serves the eastern half (Canterbury, Chelmsford, Chichester, Ely, Guildford, St Edmundsbury & Ipswich, Leicester, Lincoln, Norwich, Peterborough, Portsmouth, St Albans and Winchester). Prior to the creation of the see in 1995, the Bishop of Ebbsfleet served the entire area of the Province of Canterbury with the exceptions of the dioceses of London, Rochester and Southwark which came under the oversight of the Bishop of Fulham.

On 31 December 2010, Keith Newton resigned as the Bishop of Richborough and soon afterwards was received into the Roman Catholic Church. On 5 May 2011, Norman Banks was announced as the bishop-designate for the position. He was subsequently consecrated bishop on 16 June 2011.

List of bishops

See also

 Bishop of Beverley
 Bishop of Ebbsfleet
 Bishop of Fulham
 List of Anglo-Catholic churches in England

References

External links
 Richborough Episcopal Area
 Crockford's Clerical Directory - Listings

Richborough
Bishops of Richborough